Kevin Fitzpatrick is a Gaelic football player from County Laois in Ireland.

He plays his club football for Portlaoise and was also a member of the Laois senior team.

A very talented soccer player in his teenage years, Kevin was part of the Laois team which won the county's first ever All-Ireland Minor Football Championship in 1996 and in 2003 he was part of the Laois team that won the Leinster Senior Football Championship title for the first time in 57 years.

Although the versatile Portlaoise clubman has gone on to play at the highest level with club and county, he has also been a little unlucky from time to time in his career.

Even on that great day in 2003, as he watched his clubmate Ian Fitzgerald lift the Delaney Cup, Kevin must have felt a pang of regret at his first half dismissal which ruled him out of the subsequent All-Ireland quarter final against Armagh. He was sorely missed on that day.

Injuries haven’t been kind to Kevin either and he missed a lot of football with a long-standing groin problem. Fitzy has won Laois Senior Football Championship medals with Portlaoise in 1999, 2002, 2004, 2007, 2008 (as captain), 2009, 2010, 2011, 2012, 2013, 2014 and 2015 and was chosen as Laois captain in 2005 in the absence of Colm Parkinson.

In late 2006, Kevin was recalled to the Laois senior squad under the new manager Liam Kearns.

References 
Times article 2005

2003 Leinster final report - Irish Examiner

1978 births
Living people
Laois inter-county Gaelic footballers
Portlaoise Gaelic footballers